Biela is a lunar impact crater that is located in the rugged highlands of the southeastern Moon. It is named after Austrian astronomer Wilhelm von Biela. The crater lies to the east of Rosenberger, to the southeast of the Watt–Steinheil double crater.

The rim of this crater is overlaid by a pair of small but notable craters: Biela C across the northeast rim and Biela W along the western inner wall. The satellite crater Biela B is attached to the southwestern outer rim, and ejecta from Biela covers the northwestern part of the interior. Despite a certain degree of wear, the rim of Biela remains relatively well-defined, especially in the southeast.

The interior floor is flat and not marked by any craterlets of note. There is a central peak formation of three ridges located just to the northeast of the midpoint.

Satellite craters

By convention these features are identified on lunar maps by placing the letter on the side of the crater midpoint that is closest to Biela.

References

 
 
 
 
 
 
 
 
 
 
 

Impact craters on the Moon